is a railway station on the Keisei Main Line in Adachi, Tokyo, Japan, operated by the private railway operator Keisei Electric Railway.

Lines
The station is close to Ushida Station on the Tobu Skytree Line.

Station layout
This station consists of two side platforms serving two tracks.

Platforms

History
The station opened on 19 December 1931.

Station numbering was introduced to all Keisei Line stations on 17 July 2010. Keisei Sekiya was assigned station number KS06.

Surrounding area

 Ushida Station on the Tobu Skytree Line

See also
 List of railway stations in Japan

References

External links

  

Railway stations in Tokyo
Keisei Main Line
Railway stations in Japan opened in 1931